The Guatemala women's national under-18 volleyball team represents Guatemala in women's under-18 volleyball Events, it is controlled and managed by the National Volleyball Federation of Guatemala that is a member of North American volleyball body North, Central America and Caribbean Volleyball Confederation (NORCECA) and the international volleyball body government the Fédération Internationale de Volleyball (FIVB).

Results

Summer Youth Olympics
 Champions   Runners up   Third place   Fourth place

FIVB U18 World Championship
 Champions   Runners up   Third place   Fourth place

NORCECA Girls' U18 Championship
 Champions   Runners up   Third place   Fourth place

Pan-American U18 Cup
 Champions   Runners up   Third place   Fourth place

Team

Current squad

The following is the Cuban roster in the 2019 Girls' Youth Pan-American Volleyball Cup.

Head Coach:  William Fernandez

References

External links
FIVB profile

V
National women's under-18 volleyball teams
Volleyball in Guatemala